Vanzosaura is a genus of lizards in the family Gymnophthalmidae. The genus is endemic to South America.

Etymology
The generic name, Vanzosaura, is in honor of Brazilian herpetologist Paulo Vanzolini.

Species
The genus Vanzosaura contains three accepted species.
Vanzosaura multiscutata 
Vanzosaura rubricauda  - red-tailed vanzosaur, redtail tegu
Vanzosaura savanicola 

Nota bene: A binomial authority in parentheses indicates that the species was originally described in a genus other than Vanzosaura.

References

 
Lizards
Taxa named by Miguel Trefaut Rodrigues